Geoffrey J.D. Hewings (born 1943) is Professor of Geography and Regional Science, of Economics, of Urban and Regional Planning at the University of Illinois at Urbana-Champaign, United States. He is also the Director of the Regional Economics Applications Laboratory.

Sources
http://www.real.uiuc.edu/
http://www.regionalscience.org/CompNAwards/hewingsaward.htm 
http://www.igpa.uiuc.edu 

University of Illinois Urbana-Champaign faculty
Alumni of the University of Birmingham
Academics of the University of Kent
1943 births
Living people
Welsh economists
Regional scientists
Regional economists
Welsh emigrants to the United States